Aliagarivorans is a genus in the phylum Pseudomonadota (Bacteria).

Etymology
The name Aliagarivorans derives from:Latin adjective and pronoun alius, other, another, different; New Latin noun Agarivorans, a name of a bacterial genus; New Latin masculine gender noun Aliagarivorans, the other Agarivorans.

Species
The genus contains 2 species.

See also
 Bacterial taxonomy
 Microbiology

References 

Bacteria genera
Alteromonadales